The Wheelchair Tennis Masters refers to a pair of end of year tennis events for wheelchair athletes held on an annual basis under the jurisdiction of the International Tennis Federation.

The Wheelchair Tennis Masters for singles is an end-of-year wheelchair tennis tournament, broadly analogous to the ATP Tour and WTA Championship finals. Initiated in 1994 for men and women's singles, and 2004 for quad players (quad tennis being a mixed gender sport) both genders compete at the same event.

The top eight players (men and women), and the top six quad players, are invited to the Masters. The ranking is based on their ranking after the US Open is played. The round robin format is comparable to that which operates at the ATP World Tour Finals and WTA Championships. The Masters is described as the official ITF year-end singles championship.

Separately, the Wheelchair Tennis Masters for doubles performs a similar function for men's, women's and quad doubles players. Initiated in 2000 (2003 for quad players), each year the top eight men’s pairings, top six women's pairings and top four quad pairings are accepted into the draw in which all three events follow a round-robin format.

NEC Wheelchair Tennis Single Masters
From 1994 until 1999 the NEC Wheelchair Tennis Masters took place in the Indoor Sport Centre in Eindhoven, Netherlands. From 2000 until 2005 the NEC Wheelchair Tennis Masters took place in Amersfoort, Netherlands. From 2006 through 2010, the singles tournament took place in the Frans Otten Stadium in Amsterdam. The tournament was renamed the NEC Singles Masters in 2010, and moved to Mechelen, Belgium from 2011 to 2012. In 2013, the NEC Singles Masters took place at the Marguerite Tennis Pavilion in Mission Viejo, California. From 2014 to 2016 the NEC Singles Masters were held in London, UK, while in 2017 the tournament moved to Loughborough, UK. From 2018 the Masters is held in Orlando, Florida. Esther Vergeer holds the record, having won 14 titles between 1998 and 2011, followed by David Wagner with 11.

Results singles

Men

Women

Quads

Wheelchair Doubles Masters
From 2000 until 2001 the Wheelchair Tennis Doubles Masters took place alongside the singles event in Amersfoort. From 2002 until 2003 the Wheelchair Tennis Doubles Masters took place at the Invacare World Team Cup by Camozzi in Tremosine, Italy. From 2003 until 2004 the Camozzi company became sponsor of this tournament and it took place in Brescia, Italy. Since 2005 the event took place in the Centro Sportivo Mario Mongodi close to Bergamo, Italy. In 2011 the title sponsorship was taken up by Invacare in a two-year deal and the 2011 tournament was held in the Frans Otten stadium in Amsterdam. From 2013 to 2016, the ITF Wheelchair Doubles Masters took place at the Marguerite Tennis Pavilion in Mission Viejo, California In 2017 and 2018, the event took place in Bemmel, Netherlands. As of 2018, Taylor and Wagner are the most successful partnership across all categories, with a total of 11 titles.

Results doubles

Men

http://www.itftennis.com/wheelchair/

Women

Quads

References

External links
NEC Wheelchair Tennis Masters official website
UNIQLO Wheelchair Doubles Masters official website
NEC Wheelchair Tennis Masters at itftennis.com
UNIQLO Wheelchair Doubles Masters at itftennis.com

Masters